Amfecloral (INN), also known as amphecloral (USAN), is a stimulant drug of the phenethylamine and amphetamine chemical classes that was used as an appetite suppressant under the trade name Acutran, but is now no longer marketed.   It was classified as an anorectic drug with little to no stimulant activity in a 1970 review.  The British Pharmacopoeia Commission approved the name in 1970. The raw ingredients used in manufacturing it were d-amphetamine and chloral hydrate.

See also 
 Amfetaminil
 Amphetamine
 Clobenzorex
 Desbutal

References 

Anorectics
Substituted amphetamines
Prodrugs
Organochlorides
Norepinephrine-dopamine releasing agents